Guanagazapa is a municipality in the Escuintla department of Guatemala.

Municipalities of the Escuintla Department